Conus regius, common name the "crown cone", is a species of sea snail, a marine gastropod mollusk in the family Conidae, the cone snails and their allies.

Like all species within the genus Conus, these snails are predatory and venomous. They are capable of "stinging" and injuring or killing humans, therefore live ones should be handled carefully or not at all.

The subspecies Conus regius abbotti Clench, 1942 is a synonym of Conus jucundus G. B. Sowerby III, 1887

Distribution
This marine species occurs from in the Caribbean Sea and in the Gulf of Mexico; in the Atlantic Ocean off Brasil.

Description 
The maximum recorded shell length is 75 mm. The following images show variation in shell color and markings:
The shell has a low, distantly but distinctly tuberculated spire, and direct sides. It is slightly striate at the base. The color of the shell knows many variations. It is usually chestnut brown with blue-white spots, but white, yellow brown and pale brown variations occur as well. The aperture has a white interior, sometimes with chestnut blotches.

Venom 
The conotoxin reg2a from the C. regius is composed by 16 amino acid residues and 4 cysteines, it's considered the most potent antagonist known of acetylcholine receptors in the vertebrate brain, that have the highest affinity for nicotine. C. regius is known to have more different conotoxins than any other Cone sail species, its conotoxin it's potentially of considered of medical importance in affecting nicotine addiction. Its venom is reported to block the calcium receptors in vertebrate sensory nerve cells, which stop the nerve impulse for propagating along the nerve.

Gallery

Habitat 
Minimum recorded depth is 0 m. Maximum recorded depth is 95 m.

References

 Rosenberg, G.; Moretzsohn, F.; García, E. F. (2009). Gastropoda (Mollusca) of the Gulf of Mexico, Pp. 579–699 in: Felder, D.L. and D.K. Camp (eds.), Gulf of Mexico–Origins, Waters, and Biota. Texas A&M Press, College Station, Texas.
 Puillandre N., Duda T.F., Meyer C., Olivera B.M. & Bouchet P. (2015). One, four or 100 genera? A new classification of the cone snails. Journal of Molluscan Studies. 81: 1–23

External links
 The Conus Biodiversity website
 Cone Shells - Knights of the Sea

regius
Gastropods described in 1791
Taxa named by Johann Friedrich Gmelin